The Western International Market is a wholesale market in west London, England.

Owned and managed by Hounslow London Borough Council, the market opened in 1974 as a relocation of Brentford Market, which dated from 1306 and since 1893 had been based on a site near Kew Bridge. A fountain at the foot of the bridge, erected in 1877, now stands at the entrance to Western International Market and has Grade II listed status.

The market acts as a conduit for fresh produce airlifted to Heathrow to reach the retail and catering trades.

References

External links
 Western International Market

Buildings and structures in the London Borough of Hounslow
Wholesale markets in London